Bluefin tuna  is a common name used to refer to several species of tuna of the genus Thunnus.
 

Commercial fish
Thunnus
Fish common names